The AT&T Champions Classic was a professional golf tournament on the Champions Tour in southern California from 1990 to 2009. A mid-autumn event through 2000, it was moved to late winter in 2001.  AT&T was the main sponsor of the tournament for its final editions, held at Valencia Country Club in Santa Clarita, California.

The tournament was founded in November 1990 as the "Security Pacific Senior Classic" at Rancho Park Golf Club, a municipal course in the city of Los Angeles, where it was played through 1994. Rancho Park hosted the Los Angeles Open on the PGA Tour from 1956 through 1972 (except 1968). The purse for the inaugural event was $500,000 with a winner's share of $75,000. From 1995 through 2000, it was played at Wilshire Country Club, then moved north to Valencia in March 2001.

The purse in 2009 was $1.6 million, with a winner's share of $240,000 to playoff winner Dan Forsman, his first victory on the senior tour.

Tournament sites

Winners
AT&T Champions Classic
2009 Dan Forsman
2008 Denis Watson
2007 Tom Purtzer (2)

AT&T Classic
2006 Tom Kite (2)

SBC Classic
2005 Des Smyth
2004 Gil Morgan (3)
2003 Tom Purtzer (1)

SBC Senior Classic
2002 Tom Kite (1)
2001 Jim Colbert
2000 Joe Inman (3)

Pacific Bell Senior Classic
1999 Joe Inman (2)
1998 Joe Inman (1)

Ralphs Senior Classic
1997 Gil Morgan (2)
1996 Gil Morgan (1)
1995 John Bland
1994 Jack Kiefer
1993 Dale Douglass
1992 Raymond Floyd

Security Pacific Senior Classic
1991 John Brodie
1990 Mike Hill

Source:

References

External links
PGATOUR.com Tournament website

Former PGA Tour Champions events
Golf in California
Sports competitions in California
Recurring sporting events established in 1990
Recurring sporting events disestablished in 2009
Santa Clarita, California
1990 establishments in California
2009 disestablishments in California